Brian Tyler (born October 27, 1967 in Albion, Michigan) is an American auto racing driver.

He was a back-to-back USAC National Sprint car Champion for Larry Contos Racing in 1996 and 1997. He made 10 starts in the Indy Racing League IndyCar Series in 1998 and 1999 for 3 different teams with a best finish of 6th at the Las Vegas Motor Speedway. He attempted, but failed to qualify for the Indianapolis 500 both those years.

Tyler has 9 NASCAR Busch Series starts, and one NASCAR Craftsman Truck Series start, all made between 2001 and 2005. He also has 11 ARCA stock car starts to his credit.

Tyler continues to race in the USAC Silver Crown Series and make occasional ARCA appearances. He finished 7th in the USAC Silver Crown National Championship in 2010

Awards
1997 USAC Sprint Car Series Champion
1997 USAC Silver Crown Series Most Improved Driver
1996 USAC Sprint Car Series Champion
2006 USAC Payless Little 500, Anderson, IN. Winner.
Inducted into the Michigan Motorsports Hall of Fame in 2007

Motorsports career results

Indy Racing League 
(key) (Races in bold indicate pole position; races in italics indicate fastest lap)

Indianapolis 500

NASCAR
(key) (Bold – Pole position awarded by qualifying time. Italics – Pole position earned by points standings or practice time. * – Most laps led.)

Busch Series

Craftsman Truck Series

ARCA Racing Series
(key) (Bold – Pole position awarded by qualifying time. Italics – Pole position earned by points standings or practice time. * – Most laps led.)

References

External links
 

Living people
1967 births
People from Albion, Michigan
Racing drivers from Michigan
NASCAR drivers
IndyCar Series drivers
ARCA Menards Series drivers
USAC Silver Crown Series drivers